Lee Ji-min (born 4 September 1993) is a South Korean footballer who plays as full back for Busan IPark.

Career

Club career

Lee played college football for Ajou University.

He joined Jeonnam Dragons in January 2015.

Honours

International
South Korea U-23
 King's Cup: 2015

References

External links 

1993 births
Living people
Association football fullbacks
South Korean footballers
Jeonnam Dragons players
Seongnam FC players
K League 1 players
K League 2 players